Santa Cruz is a Pre-Romanesque Roman Catholic church located in Cangas de Onís, in Asturias, Spain.

The present church is the result of many modifications (in 1632 and in 1950 after destruction during the Spanish Civil War) to an 8th-century structure in which were buried the patrons: the king Favila of Asturias and his wife Froiluba. Favila was putatively the heir to the throne held by Pelagius of Asturias (Spanish: Pelayo).

Putatively, the church once held the battle cross of Pelayo, called the Cruz de la Victoria. During the later reconstructions, the plaque (737) detailing the foundation was left visible. It states that ''here were consecrated altars to Christ by the priest Asterion on the day 300 of the year, during the sixth age of the world, during the era 775 (October 27, 737)

See also
Asturian art
Catholic Church in Spain
Churches in Asturias
List of oldest church buildings

References

Churches in Asturias
8th-century churches in Spain
Pre-Romanesque architecture in Asturias

es:Iglesia de la Santa Cruz (Cangas de Onís)